Germany participated at the 2015 European Games, in Baku, Azerbaijan from 12 to 28 June 2015.

Medalists

Archery

Germany qualified for three quota places in both the men's and the women's archery events at the Games, and as a result also qualified for the team events.

Gymnastics

Aerobic
Two German athletes qualified after the performance at the 2013 Aerobic Gymnastics European Championships.
 Pairs – 1 pair of 2 athletes

Artistic
Women's – 3 quota places

Trampoline
Two German athletes were qualified based on the results at the 2014 European Trampoline Championships. The gymnasts competed in both the individual and the synchronized event.
 Men's – 2 quota place
 Women's – 2 quota places

Triathlon

Men's – Jonas Breinlinger
Women's – Lisa Sieburger

References

Nations at the 2015 European Games
European Games
Germany at the European Games